Red Light Fix is the debut studio album from Welsh rock band The Dirty Youth.  It was released on 9 October 2011 via Universal Records and shot straight to number 1 in the HMV online download charts.

Promotion 

Three tracks (Fight, The End, Requiem Of The Drunk) were all from The Dirty Youth EP album from 2008, the other tracks were newly recorded songs. The Dirty Youth promoted the release of Red Light Fix through touring, the most notably being Download Festival on the jagermeister stage in 2011, on Red Bull Stage in 2012 and on Zippo Second Stage in 2014

Singles
1. Fight was released on 4 September 2011 over a month prior to the full album, its B-sides included "Crying Out For You" and the Live/Stripped version of "This Is For You", Fight's music video was released on 5 September 2011 and soon went viral and has since gone on to receive more than 5 million views on YouTube.

2. Rise Up was released on 12 June 2012, its B-sides included "Battlefield" and an acoustic version of "Narcissistic Cannibal", Rise Up's music video was released on 25 April 2012

3. Last Confession was released on 17 December 2012, its B-sides included "Feel" and a live acoustic version of "Fight", Last Confession's music video was  released on 17 December 2012

4. Requiem Of The Drunk was released on 26 March 2013 over 16 months after the album's release, its B sides included some additional songs from The Dirty Youth E.P "Curtain Call" and "Sophie's Song", Requiem Of The Drunk's music video was released on 21 March 2013

Track listing 

11-15 are bonus tracks on the Special Deluxe Edition CD.

Personnel

Band
Danni Monroe - lead vocals
 Matt Bond - guitar/piano
 Luke Padfield - guitar
 Leon Watkins - bass guitar
 Tom Hall - drums

2011 albums
The Dirty Youth albums